The Apple IIc Plus is the sixth and final model in the Apple II series of personal computers, produced by Apple Computer. The "Plus" in the name was a reference to the additional features it offered over the original portable Apple IIc, such as greater storage capacity (a built-in 3.5-inch floppy drive replacing the classic 5.25-inch drive), increased processing speed, and a general standardization of the system components. In a notable change of direction, the Apple IIc Plus, for the most part, did not introduce new technology or any further evolutionary contributions to the Apple II series, instead merely integrating existing peripherals into the original Apple IIc design. The development of the 8-bit machine was criticized by quarters more interested in the significantly more advanced 16-bit Apple IIGS.

History
The Apple IIc Plus was introduced on September 16, 1988, at the AppleFest conference in San Francisco, with less fanfare than the Apple IIc had received four years earlier. Described as little more than a "turbocharged version of the IIc with a high-capacity 3½ disk drive" by one magazine review of the time, some users were disappointed. Many IIc users already had add-ons giving them something rather close to what the new model offered.

Before the official release of the machine, it had been rumored to be a slotless version of the Apple IIGS squeezed into the portable case of the Apple IIc. Apple employee John Arkley, one of the engineers working on the Apple IIc Plus project, had devised rudimentary plans for an enhanced Apple IIGS motherboard that would fit in the IIc case, and petitioned management for the go-ahead with such a project; the idea was rejected.

When the project started the original plan was to just replace the 5.25-inch floppy drive with a 3.5-inch, without modifying the IIc design. Other features, consequently, were added as the project progressed. It is believed the Apple IIc Plus design, and its existence at all, was influenced by a third-party Apple IIc-compatible known as the Laser 128. It is not a coincidence that the Apple IIc Plus is very similar in design to the Laser 128EX/2 model, released shortly before the Apple IIc Plus. As it was fully backwards-compatible, the Apple IIc Plus replaced the Apple IIc.

Codenames for the machine while under development included: Raisin, Pizza, and Adam Ant.

Overview

Three major new features
The Apple IIc Plus had comprised three new features compared to the IIc. The first and most noticeable feature was the replacement of the 5.25-inch floppy drive with the new 3.5-inch drive. Besides offering nearly six times the storage capacity (800 KB), the new drive had a much faster seek time (three times faster) and button-activated motorized ejection. To accommodate the increased data flow of the new drive, specialized chip circuitry called the MIG, an acronym for "Magic Interface Glue", was designed and added to the motherboard along with a dedicated 2 KB static RAM buffer (the MIG chip is the only exception to there being no new technological developments present in the machine).

The second most important feature was a faster 65C02 processor. Running at 4 MHz, it made the computer faster than any other Apple II, including the IIGS.  Apple licensed the Zip Chip Apple II accelerator from third-party developer Zip Technologies and added to the IIc Plus; instead of the all-in-one tall chip design, Apple engineers broke out the design into its core components and integrated them into the motherboard (a 4 MHz CPU, 8 KB of combined static RAM cache, and logic). Apple stated its performance as three times faster (3.3 times according to benchmarks) than any other 8-bit Apple II. The CPU acceleration was a last-minute feature addition, which in turn made the specialized circuitry for the use of a 3.5-inch drive unnecessary at full CPU speed as the machine was now fast enough to handle the data flow; that circuitry was left in place and put into operation nonetheless to support 1 MHz mode. By default the machine ran at 4 MHz, but holding down the 'ESC' key during a cold or warm boot disabled the acceleration so it could run at a standard 1 MHz operation — necessary for older software that depended on timing, especially games.

The third major change was the internalization of the power supply into the Apple IIc Plus's case, utilizing a new miniature design from Sony and replacing the previous "brick on a leash" external supply design.

A new look and minor changes

Cosmetic changes were apparent as well. The keyboard layout and style now mirrored that of the Apple IIGS and Macintosh, including an enlarged "Return" key and updated modifier keys (Open and Solid Apple being replaced by "Command" and "Option"). Above the keyboard, the rarely used "40/80" switch was replaced by a sliding volume control (gone was the left side volume-control dial, and as a cost-cutting measure, the audio headphone jack disappeared with it). The case housing and keyboard had been changed to the light-grey Apple platinum color, creating a seamless blend between keyboard and case, making them appear almost as one. The machine, a half pound lighter than the original IIc, weighed in at 7 pounds (3.2 kg).

In the rear of the machine the most obvious change was a three-prong AC plug connector and power switch where the voltage converter had once been, a Kensington security slot at the top left corner, and the standardization of the serial port connectors (changed from DIN-5 to mini DIN-8, but still providing an identical signal). All the same built-in Apple II peripheral equivalents and port functionality of the IIc remained, with the one exception being the floppy port. Whereas the previous IIc could only support one external 5.25-inch floppy drive and (in later models) "intelligent" storage devices such as the UniDisk 3.5, the Apple IIc Plus offered backwards port compatibility and more. Support for the external Apple 3.5 Drive used by the Apple IIGS and Macintosh was now present, and up to two external 5.25-inch floppy drives could be added as well.

Internally, the new motherboard sported a pin connector for an internal modem; however no products ever utilized it. The same memory expansion socket introduced on late-model IIc's was present, although it was not compatible with memory cards designed for the previous system. The ROM firmware (now labeled revision "5", following in the sequence from the original IIc) remained the same size, as did RAM, meaning the machine continued to ship with only 128 KB of memory.

Negative aspects
The most criticized aspect of the Apple IIc Plus, even among collectors today, is the lack of an internal 5.25-inch drive. The reason for this is the vast majority of software for the 8-bit Apple II series shipped on 5.25-inch disks (often hardcoded for the medium) making the machine of limited use unless an external 5.25-inch drive is added. 

Along the same lines of breaking with standards, most 8-bit Apple II software (particularly games) had been designed to run at 'normal' 1.024 MHz operation, but the IIc Plus ran natively at 4 MHz. While user adjustable, the IIc Plus had no automated method to lock-down or "remember" the CPU speed (e.g. a physical turbo button or software-based Control Panel), meaning it would always default back to 'fast' 4 MHz operation if power cycled, reset or simply warm-booted. Acceleration could only be temporarily disabled with a special key press, making it inconvenient for users to repeatedly lower the clock speed manually (for example, booting games on different floppy diskettes). 

Another unpopular change was the removal of the voltage converter. While the built-in power supply made the IIc Plus a more integrated one-piece unit for desktop use, the negative aspect was the loss of the ability to operate the machine from a battery source. This, in turn, eroded the portability aspect of the IIc series–a main selling point even despite its lack of a built-in screen, rooting it further to a desktop-only environment. 

The removal of the audio-out jack used for headphones or a speaker was another feature users missed.

Reception
inCider in November 1988 found that the Apple IIc Plus was faster than a IIGS, Laser 128EX/2, or Apple IIe with a Zip Chip. It favorably cited the improved keyboard, internal power supply, and Macintosh/IIGS-compatible serial port, but said that the computer "isn't everything it could be", criticizing the lack of change from the IIc's memory capacity ("128K doesn't quite cut it") and difficulty in adding more. The magazine concluded, "It's disappointing that a company as technologically sophisticated as Apple couldn't have gone a step further ... The IIc Plus is a nice system, but it's too little, too late". A separate editorial in the issue began "What if you announced a new computer and nobody cared? Apple Computer could be facing such a dilemma". Even with an accompanying price increase for the IIGS, the magazine stated that "unless you really want a small, easily transportable computer, there's little reason to buy the IIc Plus over the IIGS ... the improvements over the IIc simply aren't that significant". Regarding the 3.5-inch drive the magazine stated, "there are thousands of good, affordable programs that won't be released in 3 1/2-inch format ... bargain hunters will want access to classic educational and entertainment programs that are available only on 5 1/4-inch disks". While praising Apple for continuing to support Apple II owners the editorial criticized the company for announcing "a new product that uses old technology" at a price higher than that of the Laser 128 EX/2 or an inexpensive PC clone, comparing the IIc Plus to the unsuccessful IBM PCjr. It concluded that "the IIc Plus simply clouds the Apple II picture".

Technical specifications

Microprocessor
65C02 running at either 1 MHz or 4 MHz (user-selectable)
8 KB SRAM cache (16 KB physical installed; 8 KB for TAG/DATA)
8-bit data bus

Memory
128 KB RAM built-in
Expandable from 128 KB to 1.125 MB RAM
32 KB ROM built-in

Video
40 and 80 columns text, with 24 lines¹
Low-Resolution: 40×48 (16 colors)
High-Resolution: 280×192 (6 colors) *
Double-Low-Resolution: 80×48 (16 colors)
Double-High-Resolution: 560×192 (16 colors) *

*effectively 140×192 in color, due to pixel placement restrictions

¹Text can be mixed with graphic modes, replacing either bottom 8 or 32 lines, depending on video mode

Audio
Built-in speaker; 1-bit toggling
User-adjustable volume (manual sliding switch)

Built-in storage
Internal 3.5-inch floppy drive
800 KB, double-sided
Motorized ejection/auto-injection

Internal connectors
IIc Plus Memory Expansion Card connector (34-pin)
Internal modem (7-pin)

Specialized chip controllers
IWM (Integrated Woz Machine) for floppy drives
MIG (Magic Interface Glue) with 2 KB SRAM, for "dumb" 3.5-inch drive support
Dual 6551 ACIA chips for serial I/O

External connectors
Joystick/Mouse (DE-9)
Printer, serial-1 (mini DIN-8)
Modem, serial-2 (mini DIN-8)
Video Expansion Port (D-15)
Floppy drive SmartPort (D-19)
NTSC composite video output (RCA connector)

Notes of interest

Revisions
The Apple IIc Plus had a relatively short product lifespan, produced for only two years (it was officially discontinued in November 1990). Though for many years it was believed that there had been no changes or revisions made to the machine, in 2008 hobbyists discovered the existence of two versions of the motherboard. While the revised board contained several minor differences (mainly different ASIC manufacturers and markings), there were no updates or bug fixes seen in the firmware (which was still identified as ROM version '5').

No international versions
There were also no international versions of the Apple IIc Plus produced, so the keyboard, unlike the original IIc, was only manufactured with American English printed keycaps and the 'Keyboard' switch was utilized solely for changing between QWERTY and DVORAK layout (rather than localized keyboard layouts). Consequently, the Apple IIc Plus was only sold in the U.S. — not even Canadian Apple dealers were authorized to distribute or sell it.

End of the line
Although it wasn't intended to be, fate would have it that the Apple IIc Plus would be the last new Apple II model. But even back in 1988, before this was known, the Apple IIc Plus could be seen as signaling the beginning of the end for the Apple II series, or at the very least, a hint at the direction Apple Computer was taking with the line. In releasing the IIc Plus, Apple management essentially made a statement that the Apple IIGS was no longer considered a top priority, and if anything, gave it a back seat when it was the only possible future for the evolution and continued success of the Apple II line. That, in turn, signified that the Apple II line as a whole, despite its promise and potential, was no longer considered important at Apple headquarters. Consequently, from this point forward, the Apple II was milked for financial gain as much as possible, while at the same time a cap was placed on its evolution and advancement so it wouldn't overshadow and compete with the Macintosh, the company's then-new focus and chosen future. 

Further proof of this was that, a year after the release of the oddly out-of-place and retro-designed Apple IIc Plus, only a minor maintenance release of the Apple IIGS was introduced (mainly boasting more RAM and improved firmware) rather than any of the desperately needed hardware changes required to keep the machine viable. Prototypes of more advanced Apple IIs (namely in the form of a new IIGS) were delayed and eventually cancelled as the company decided what to do with its Apple II product line. The end result was to allow it to slowly fade out into obscurity due to a lack of development or support. The Apple II line carried on until October 1993, when the IIe was discontinued.

See also
List of Apple II games
List of publications and periodicals devoted to the Apple II
Apple II peripheral cards
KansasFest – an annual convention of Apple II users

Notes

External links
A2Central.com  — Apple II news and downloads

PCB pictures of the Apple II
Apple2clones has information on Apple II clones
Apple2Online.com — Software, documentation, games, books, etc., for the entire Apple II family of computers

C Plus
Computer-related introductions in 1988